Shangzhi is a city in Harbin, Heilongjiang, China.

Shangzhi may also refer to:
Shangzhi (1094–1096), reign period of Gao Shengtai who ruled present-day Yunnan as an emperor
Shangzhi Town, Shangzhi City
Shangzhi Township, Chaoyang County, Liaoning, China
Shangzhi Subdistrict, Daoli District, Harbin, Heilongjiang, China

See also
Zhao Shangzhi (1908–1942), Chinese general after whom the places are named